Kerala Lokayukta is the Parliamentary Ombudsman for the state of Kerala (India). It is a high level statutory functionary,  created to address grievances of the public against ministers, legislators, administration and public servants in issues related to misuse of power, mal-administration and corruption. It was first formed under the Kerala Lokayukta and Upa-Lokayukta Act, and approved by the president of India on 4th March 1999. The passage of Lokpal and Lokayukta's Act,2013 in Parliament had become law from January 16,2014 and requires each state to appoint its Lokayukta within a year.  A bench of Lokayukta should consist of judicial and non-judicial members. An Upa-Lokayukta is a deputy to Lokayukta and assists him in his work and acts in-charge Lokayukta in case the position fells vacant before time.

A Lokayukta of the state is appointed to office by the state Governor after consulting the committee consisting of State Chief Minister, Speaker of Legislative Assembly, Leader of Opposition, Chairman of Legislative Council and Leader of Opposition of Legislative Council and cannot be removed from office except for reasons specified in the Act and will serve the period of five years.

History and administration 

Kerala Lokayukta was formed on 15th November 1998 by the state Governor after the bill was signed by President of India. It resolved 34,662 cases out of 35,986 cases filed before it from the date of its formation. Every year November 15 is observed as Lokayukta Day in state. Till 2019 around 1320 cases were pending before it.

Oath or affirmation

Powers 

Kerala Lokayukta Act makes provision for the appointment of Lokayukta and authorities with certain functions with powers to enquire into complaints or other allegations against any officials mentioned in the Act for their actions mentioned in the Act. Kerala Lokayukta can only make recommendations to competent authority but can't enforce the punishment.

Appointment and tenure 

Following is the list of Lokayuktas along with their tenure-

Notable cases 

Kerala Lokayukta had issued the following important orders

1. Kerala Lokayukta had issued notices to Chief Minister and some of his ministers in year 2019 on a complaint filed alleging misuse of funds from Chief Minister's Distress Relief Fund.

2. Complaint was filed in Lokayukta in the year 2021 against serving Minister for Forests AK Saseendran relating to the case of assault and abuse of power.

3. Kerala Lokayukta recommended action against the serving Higher Education and Minority Welfare Minister K T Jaleel for appointing his second cousin K T Adeeb to Kerala State Minorities Development Finance Corporation as General Manager after modifying the eligibility for the post and abusing the power of a Minister.

4. In year 2011, Kerala Lokayukta had issued orders for the appearance of serving Chief Minister VS Achuthanandan`s son in an allegation related to bribery by opposition party.

Related articles 

 Lokpal and Lokayuktas Act, 2013

References

External links 
 official website

Kerala
Lokayuktas